Hoym is a town and former municipality in the district of Salzlandkreis in the German state of Saxony-Anhalt. Since 15 July 2009, it is part of the town Seeland. Hoym is located on the river Selke, between the towns Aschersleben and Quedlinburg. One of the main features of the town is Schloss Hoym, which is used as a home for the mentally handicapped. Hoym is part of the Verwaltungsgemeinschaft ("collective municipality") Seeland, district Salzlandkreis. Olympian Burckhardt Hoppe was born here.

References

Towns in Saxony-Anhalt
Former municipalities in Saxony-Anhalt
Seeland, Germany
Duchy of Anhalt